Karlsborg Municipality (Karlsborgs kommun) is a municipality in Västra Götaland County in western Sweden. Its seat is located in the town of Karlsborg.

The present municipality was formed in 1971 when "old" Karlsborg was amalgamated with Mölltorp and Undenäs.

The area has been dominated by Karlsborg Fortress and military activity throughout the last centuries.

Tiveden National Park is partly situated within the municipality. The Flugebyn airfield, home of the Västergötland Skydiving Club (Västergötlands Fallskärmsklubb) also lies in the municipality.

References

External links

Karlsborg Municipality - Official site

 
Municipalities of Västra Götaland County
Skaraborg